Ardisia etindensis is a species of plant in the family Primulaceae. It is endemic to Cameroon.  Its natural habitat is subtropical or tropical dry forests. It is threatened by habitat loss.

References

etindensis
Endemic flora of Cameroon
Critically endangered flora of Africa
Taxonomy articles created by Polbot